George "Jocka" Todd (10 January 1903 – 13 August 1986) was an Australian rules footballer in the (then) Victorian Football League (VFL).

Football
A tight checking full-back who spoiled well, Todd played his whole career with Geelong Football Club.

George was recruited from Queenscliff Football Club and played mainly at centre half-forward before transferring to the back line where he played the majority of his games as full back. He possessed outstanding skills and at times was unbeatable. He had the ability to punch the ball away from his opponents no matter how high they were in the air, and played in an era of some of the great full-forwards. His judgement was superb. A master of the drop kick he frequently landed the ball in the centre of the ground. Noted for his fair play, he was never ruffled under pressure.

He was playing coach of Terang in the 1938 Hampden Football League season.

Australian Football Hall of Fame
In 1996 Todd was inducted into the Australian Football Hall of Fame.

See also
 1927 Melbourne Carnival

Footnotes

References

External links 

1903 births
1986 deaths
Australian rules footballers from Victoria (Australia)
Australian Rules footballers: place kick exponents
Australian Football Hall of Fame inductees
Geelong Football Club players
Geelong Football Club Premiership players
Carji Greeves Medal winners
Terang Football Club players
Terang Football Club coaches
Two-time VFL/AFL Premiership players